The Twentieth Duke (Italian: Il ventesimo duca) is a 1945 Italian comedy film directed by Lucio De Caro and starring Paola Veneroni, Roberto Villa and Paola Borboni.

The film is based on a 1925 play by Ugo Falena which had previous been made into films on two occasions The Last Lord (1926) and The Woman Dressed As a Man (1932). The story tells of the only surviving relative of an old Duke, his granddaughter, who pretends to be a man in order to convince him that the line of succession is secure.

It was shot at the Cinecitta Studios in Rome. It was made in 1943, but its release was delayed for two years. It did not go on a full national release until early 1946.

Cast
 Paola Veneroni as Freddie  
 Roberto Villa as Il principe Cristiano  
 Paola Borboni as La principessa di Danimarca  
 Domenico Viglione Borghese as Il vecchio duca di Bressy  
 Giuseppe Porelli as Francesco, il domestico  
 Lucciana Danieli as Alice  
 Daisy Ammon
 Nelly Morgan
 Flora Torrigiani

References

Bibliography 
 Roberto Chiti & Roberto Poppi. I film: Tutti i film italiani dal 1930 al 1944. Gremese Editore, 2005.

External links 
 

1945 films
Italian comedy films
Italian black-and-white films
1945 comedy films
Films directed by Lucio De Caro
Remakes of Italian films
Films shot at Cinecittà Studios
1940s Italian films
1940s Italian-language films